Amarna Letter EA10 is the letter of the Amarna series of diplomatic correspondence designated EA 10, which is written in cuneiform writing showing the continuation of a correspondence between Burna-Buriash II (otherwise known as Burra-Buriyaš) an ancient king of Babylon (named Karduniaš in the 1350BC Amarna time period), and Akhenaten (also known as Amenophis IV), an ancient pharaoh of Egypt.

Some part of the contents of the letter indicates (in addition to EA11) that the Egyptian pharaoh married his daughters (named Meritaten and Ankhesenpaaten) at a time when they were about 11 or 12 years of age.

Within the letter Burna-Buriash II praises the craftsmen of the land of Akhenaten, and requests a model of an animal, either land or aquatic, and he is apparently indifferent to which of the two the pharaoh should choose to have created.

The letter is part of a series of correspondences from Babylonia to Egypt, which run from EA2 to EA4 and EA6 to EA14. EA1 and EA5 are from Egypt to Babylonia.

The letter

EA 10: "Egyptian Gold and Carpenters"
EA 10, letter number five of six, from Karduniash (Babylon), by King Burna-Buriash II. (Not a linear, line-by-line translation.)

Obverse

(Lines 1-7)–[Say t]o Naphu]rar[ey]a,1 the king of [Egypt: T]hus Burra-Buriyas, the king of Karad[uniyaš] . For me all goes wel[l]. For you, for your household, for your wives, fo[r your sons ], for your magnates, for your troops, for your chariots, for your horses, and for your country, may all go very well.

(8-24)–From the time of Karaindaš, since the messengers2 of your ancestors came regularly to my ancestors, up to the present, they (the ancestors) have been friends. Now, though you and I are friends, 3 times have your messengers come to me and you have not sent me a single beautiful greeting-gift, nor have I for my part sent you a beautiful greeting-gift. (I am one for whom nothing is scarce, and you are one for whom nothing is scarce.)3 As for your messenger whom you sent to me, the 20 minas of gold that were brought here were not all there. When they put it into the kiln, not 5 minas of gold appeared.4 [The ... th]at did appear, on cooling off looked like ashes. Was [ the gold ev]er identifi[ed] (as gold)?5 [ ... ] friends with e[ach other] [ ... ] ...

bottom

(25-28)–[ ... ]

reverse

(29-42)–[ ... ] of a wild ox for ... [ ... ]6 when your messenger ... [ ... ]7  let him bring to to me.  There are skilled carpenters8 where you are. Let them represent a wild animal, land or aquatic, lifelike,9 so that the hide is exactly like that of a live animal. Let your messenger bring it to me. But if there are some old ones already on hand, then as soon as Šindišugab, my messenger, reaches you, let him immediately, posthaste, borrow chariot[s]10 and get here. Let them make some n[e]w ones for future delivery, and then when my messenger comes here with your messenger, let them bring (them) here together.(43-49)–I send as your greeting-gift 2 minas of lapis lazuli, and concerning your daughter Mayati,11 having heard (about her), I send to her as her greeting-gift a necklace of cricket-(shaped) gems, of lapis-lazuli, 1048 their number. And when your messenger [ comes ] along with Šindišugab, I will make [ ... ] and have {it}' brough[t to h]er.''12 -- (complete EA 10, with many lacunae and bottom 3 lines missing on obverse, total lines 1-49)

See also
Amarna letters: EA 1, EA 2, EA 3, EA 4, EA 5, EA 6, EA 7, EA 8, EA 9, EA 11

References

Ext links

Obverse of letter (altered photographic width)
CDLI entry of EA 10 (Chicago Digital Library Initiative )
CDLI listing of all EA Amarna letters, 1-382

Amarna letters
Kassites